Hillsong Church São Paulo  is a congregation of Hillsong Church which meets in São Paulo, Brazil, the largest city in the Americas. Other satellite congregations meet in Sydney, London, Paris, Kyiv, Cape Town, Stockholm, New York City and Buenos Aires.

According to Hillsong Church senior pastor Brian Houston, the inauguration of the church in Brazil will be a major breakthrough. The pastor also pointed out that the Portuguese language, spoken in Brazil, is one of the most important in the world and it is a great achievement to open the Hillsong church in the city that is the heart of Latin America.

Chris and Lucy Mendez are pastors responsible for opening the church in the two largest cities in South America, Hillsong Buenos Aires and Hillsong São Paulo.

The church

The first official worship service of Hillsong Church São Paulo, held on May 31, 2016, filled the Audio Club, a concert hall located in the neighbourhood of Barra Funda that has 3.2 thousand people standing or a thousand seated. Recently, the church met in the Villaggio JK auditorium, located in Vila Olímpia, near the center of São Paulo.

References

External links
 

Hillsong Church
Pentecostal churches in Brazil
Contemporary worship music
Protestantism in Brazil
Christian organizations established in 2016